Schattenburg is a castle, museum and restaurant in Feldkirch, Vorarlberg (Austria).

Its name is assumedly derived from the word stem "schatte, schad" meaning "protection, shield".

History 
Hugo I. of Montfort, founder of the town of Feldkirch, built the castle around 1200. The various Dukes of Montfort live here until 1390. Afterwards, the castle was sold to the Habsburgs.

The Schattenburg has been owned by the city since 1825. Feldkirch bought it for more than 800 guilders at the time, which roughly corresponds to the value of eight good tournament horses at the time.

Over the years, the castle has undergone several wars and suffered some damage, but it has been constantly renovated. Today, it is one of the best preserved medieval castles in Central Europe.

The Schattenburg museum 
The museum offers a total of eighteen museum rooms on three floors. Each room is dedicated to a different aspect of Feldkirch's city history and leads visitors back in time. Weapons from the Middle Ages to the World War II are on display in the castle guard.

In 2017 more than 30,000 people mentioned the museum. The castle houses a restaurant next to the museum.

See also 

 List of castles in Austria
 List of museums in Vorarlberg

External links
Official website of the museum
Website of the restaurant

References

Castles in Vorarlberg
Tourist attractions in Vorarlberg
Museums in Vorarlberg
History museums in Austria